Allocasuarina monilifera, commonly known as necklace sheoak, is a shrub of the genus Allocasuarina native to Tasmania and Victoria.

It grows in a variety of regions including coastal and sub-alpine.

References

External links
  Occurrence data for Allocasuarina monilifera from The Australasian Virtual Herbarium

monilifera
Flora of Tasmania
Flora of Victoria (Australia)
Fagales of Australia